Chespirito is a genus of fireflies (family Lampyridae). They are the type genus and sole constituent of the subfamily Chespiritoinae. This genus is somewhat unusual among fireflies in a complete lack of bioluminescent organs in the adults.

Distribution
Chespirito is only known to occur in Mexico but is hypothesized to occur in nearby countries, such as Guatemala, Belize and Honduras.

Systematics and nomenclature
The genus Chespirito is not closely related to any other firefly lineages, and is given placement as the sole member of its own subfamily. The genus name is in homage to the Mexican actor Roberto Gómez Bolaños, commonly known by his stage name Chespirito, or "Little Shakespeare".

Species
 Chespirito ballantyneae Ferreira, Keller, & Branham, 2020
 Chespirito lloydi Ferreira, Keller, & Branham, 2020
 Chespirito zaragozai Ferreira, Keller, & Branham, 2020

References

Lampyridae
Lampyridae genera